Brad Raymond Trumbull (November 25, 1924 – November 25, 1994) was an American film, stage and television actor. He was known for playing the role of Brody in the American crime drama television series The Lawless Years.

After serving in the army during World War II, Trumbull studied at the Pasadena Playhouse, graduating in 1950. Trumbull began his career in 1952, as appearing in the television series Gang Busters. He guest-starred in television programs including Gunsmoke, One Day at a Time, Diff'rent Strokes, M*A*S*H, Mister Ed, The Golden Girls, Tales of Wells Fargo, The Andy Griffith Show, Mannix, The Doris Day Show and Highway Patrol. Trumbull also appeared in over ninety episodes of the variety television series The Carol Burnett Show.  He also appeared on the episode "Cellmates" of Mama's Family playing a police officer who gets assaulted by Eunice. He had a non-speaking role in the episode "Edie Gets Married" on The Mary Tyler Moore Show playing Edie's new husband, Howard Gordon. 

Trumbull died in November 1994 of heart failure in Canoga Park, California on his 70th birthday.

References

External links 

Rotten Tomatoes profile

1924 births
1994 deaths
American male film actors
American male television actors
American male stage actors
20th-century American male actors